The Virgin and Child is a 1505 oil on panel painting by Cima da Conegliano, now in the National Gallery, London, which bought it in 1860.

References

1505 paintings
London 1505
Collections of the National Gallery, London